Alexandria Airport  is a public-use airport located in Alexandria Township, New Jersey, two nautical miles (3.704 km) west of Pittstown, in Hunterdon County, New Jersey, United States. The airport is privately owned.

Alexandria Airport conducted an annual balloon festival from 1989 to 1998.

References

External links

Airports in New Jersey
Alexandria Township, New Jersey
Transportation buildings and structures in Hunterdon County, New Jersey